The ambassador of the United Kingdom to Russia (Russian: Британский Посол в России) is the United Kingdom's foremost  diplomatic representative in the Russian Federation and head of the UK's diplomatic mission in Russia. The official title is His Britannic Majesty's Ambassador to the Russian Federation.

Between 1844 and 1860 the status of the head of mission in Saint Petersburg was reduced from Ambassador to Envoy Extraordinary and Plenipotentiary. The capital of Russia, and later of the Soviet Union (from 1922 to 1991), moved to Moscow in 1918.

List of heads of mission
For the envoys to Russia from the Court of St James's before the creation of the United Kingdom of Great Britain and Ireland in 1801, see List of ambassadors of the Kingdom of England to Russia (for the period until 1707) and List of ambassadors of Great Britain to Russia (for the years 1707 to 1800).

Ambassadors Extraordinary and Plenipotentiary
1800-1801: Diplomatic Relations were suspended during the Second League of Armed Neutrality.
1801–1802: The Lord St Helens
1802–1804: Sir John Borlase Warren, Bt
1804–1806: Lord Granville Leveson-Gower
1805–1806: The Lord Cathcart
1807: Marquess of Douglas and Clydesdale Special Mission
1807: Lord Granville Leveson-Gower (again)
1807–1812: Diplomatic Relations suspended following Treaty of Tilsit
1812: Edward Thornton Plenipotentiary to negotiate at Stockholm
1812–1820: The Viscount Cathcart (created Earl Cathcart while in post in 1814)
1820–1825: Sir Charles Bagot
1820–1824: Hon. Frederick Cathcart Minister Plenipotentiary ad interim
1824–1825: Edward Michael Ward Minister Plenipotentiary ad interim
1825–1826: The Viscount Strangford
 1825–1828 : Edward Cromwell Disbrowe Minister Plenipotentiary ad interim
1828–1832: Sir William à Court, Bt
1828–1832: Hon. William Temple Minister Plenipotentiary ad interim
1832–1833: Sir Stratford Canning (nominally ambassador, but did not go)
1832–1835: Hon. John Duncan Bligh Minister Plenipotentiary ad interim
1835–1837: The Earl of Durham
1837–1838: John Ralph Milbanke Minister Plenipotentiary ad interim
1838–1841: The Marquess of Clanricarde
1841–1844: The Lord Stuart de Rothesay

Envoys Extraordinary and Ministers Plenipotentiary
 1844–1851 : John Bloomfield (succeeded as Baron Bloomfield while in post in 1846)
 1851–1854 : Sir George Hamilton Seymour
 1854–1856: No representation due to the Crimean War
 1856–1858 : The Lord Wodehouse
 1858–1860 : Sir John Crampton, Bt

Ambassadors

See also
 List of ambassadors of Russia to the United Kingdom

References

External links
UK and Russia, gov.uk

Russia
 
United Kingdom